Louis Hémon (12 October 1880 – 8 July 1913), was a French writer best known for his novel Maria Chapdelaine.

Biography 
He was born in Brest, France. In Paris, where he resided with his family, he was enrolled in the Montaigne and Louis-le-Grand secondary schools. A bilingual secretary in several maritime agencies, he collaborated, starting from 1904, in a Parisian sports journal. After his studies of law and oriental languages in the Sorbonne, he moved to London.

In 1911, he moved to Canada, settling initially in Montreal. Hémon wrote Maria Chapdelaine during his time working at a farm in the Lac Saint-Jean region.

Hémon died when he was struck by a train at Chapleau, Ontario. He never saw the widespread publication of his landmark novel.

Since his death, Maria Chapdelaine has been translated into more than 20 languages in 23 countries, while other novels were published posthumously. The work was also celebrated through a series of paintings by renowned Canadian artist, Rajka Kupesic.

Hémon had one daughter, Lydia-Kathleen, from a relationship in England with Lydia O'Kelly.

He is the subject of two biographical studies, L'aventure Louis Hémon (1974) by Alfred Ayotte and Victor Tremblay, and Louis Hémon, le fou du lac by Mathieu-Robert Sauvé.

Bibliography 
 1908: Lizzie Blakeston
 1913: Maria Chapdelaine
 1923: La Belle que voilà
 1924: Colin-Maillard
 1926: Battling Malone, pugiliste
 1950: Monsieur Ripois et la Némésis

Notes

External links

 Biography at the Dictionary of Canadian Biography Online
 
 
  
 
 Collections Canada: Louis Hémon, accessed 3 July 2006
 Bookrags: Louis Hémon, accessed 3 July 2006
 

1880 births
1913 deaths
Writers from Brest, France
20th-century French novelists
Writers from Quebec
Canadian novelists in French
Railway accident deaths in Canada
Accidental deaths in Ontario
Lycée Louis-le-Grand alumni
French male novelists
20th-century Canadian male writers
20th-century Canadian novelists
20th-century French male writers